Todd Holt (born January 20, 1973) is a former Canadian professional hockey player. Holt was drafted 184th overall in the 1993 NHL Entry Draft by the San Jose Sharks, following a junior career in which Holt had two 100 point seasons. He is the Broncos' all-time leading scorer in points and goals, with 423 points.

Personal
Holt was sexually abused by junior coach Graham James during his time with the Swift Current Broncos. He testified against James, along with fellow victims Fleury and Sheldon Kennedy, during a trial in 2012.

His cousin is former NHL star Theoren Fleury, who was also abused by James.

Career statistics

References

External links 

1973 births
Living people
San Jose Sharks draft picks
Swift Current Broncos players
Birmingham Bulls (ECHL) players
Heilbronner EC players
Kansas City Blades players
Roanoke Express players
Fresno Falcons players
EC Kapfenberg players
Canadian ice hockey right wingers